Able One is a New Zealand-bred Hong Kong based Thoroughbred racehorse.

In the season of 2009-2010, Able One win the HKG2 Chairman's Trophy, and he then followed up in the Champions Mile. Able One also is one of the nominees of Hong Kong Horse of the Year.

References
 The Hong Kong Jockey Club – Able One Racing Record
 The Hong Kong Jockey Club

Racehorses trained in Hong Kong
Hong Kong racehorses
Racehorses bred in New Zealand
Thoroughbred family 4-n